The Sumay Cemetery is a historic cemetery at the junction of Sumay Drive and Guam Highway 1 on the grounds of Naval Base Guam, located on the west side of the United States territory of Guam. The cemetery was probably established in the late 19th century; its oldest legible marker bears the date 1911. It is the oldest known historic-era cemetery on the island, and is the only tangible reminder of the village of Sumay, which effectively ceased to exist when the naval base took over the area and its citizens were relocated to the village of Santa Rita.

The cemetery was listed on the National Register of Historic Places in 1999.

See also
 National Register of Historic Places listings in Guam

References

External links
 
 
 

Cemeteries on the National Register of Historic Places
Buildings and structures on the National Register of Historic Places in Guam
Buildings and structures completed in 1911
1911 establishments in Guam
Sumay, Guam